Paygelan (also Romanized as Pāygelān and Pāygalān; also known as Pai Gilan, Pa yi Gīlān, Pāy Kalān, and Pāykalān) is a village in Paygelan Rural District, in the Central District of Sarvabad County, Kurdistan Province, Iran. At the 2006 census, its population was 1,920, in 457 families. The village is populated by Kurds.

References 

Towns and villages in Sarvabad County
Kurdish settlements in Kurdistan Province